David William Downing (born 6 October 1969) is an English former professional footballer who played as a striker in the Football League for York City, and in non-League football for Goole Town.

References

1969 births
Living people
Sportspeople from Bideford
English footballers
Association football forwards
York City F.C. players
Goole Town F.C. players
English Football League players